Located on the edge of Howard and Miami counties in Indiana, Howard-Miami Mennonite Church is a historical Mennonite church affiliated with the Evana Network. The first Mennonite settlers were from Holmes County, Ohio, and arrived in Miami county in 1848. From these meager beginnings the church grew and built their first church house in 1871. Major remodeling has occurred six times over the years, the most recent being the addition of a large fellowship hall in 1987. Remodeling of the sanctuary occurred in 1999. Howard-Miami is the oldest Mennonite church in Indiana, having conducted church services starting in 1848
. 

The church is nestled on three acres of land surrounded by rich corn and soybean fields. The building is wheelchair accessible and features a large sanctuary with beautiful stained-glass artistry behind the stage and a balcony with multiple classrooms. It also has two basements for the children’s ministry, a large entry and fellowship hall with attached kitchen and also a cozy library. Off the fellowship hall is the main office and pastors’ offices.  Outside there is a pavilion with roof (added in 2020) and kitchen area and a playground.

Located on the county line between Howard and Miami Counties in rural Indiana, the church sits just one mile South of State Road 18, providing easy access to the nearest cities of Kokomo, Peru, and Marion, all between 15 and 20 miles away.

Ongoing missions
The church currently has mission partners in Slovenia, Uganda, and the United States.

External links
 www.HowardMiami.org

Buildings and structures in Howard County, Indiana
Mennonite church buildings in Indiana
Mennonite congregations
Buildings and structures in Miami County, Indiana